Omar Shishani may refer to
Mohammad Omar Shishani, Jordanian football player 
Abu Omar al-Shishani, commander for the Islamic State in Syria